The Herefordshire School is the name of a hypothetical group of master masons working in Herefordshire and Worcestershire (in England) during the 12th century. The name was coined by Polish-English scholar George Zarnecki. Their distinctive Romanesque sandstone and limestone carvings are to be found in several parish churches in the area, most notably Kilpeck, but also Eardisley, Shobdon and Castle Frome in Herefordshire, and Rock, Worcestershire. Their work draws on a variety of cultural sources for its religious and mystical images; Norman military figures, Anglo-Saxon animals and Celtic abstract patterns combine to create a unique and beautiful synthesis. Despite its overtly religious nature, Herefordshire School work also has a playful, occasionally bawdy approach.

Carvings at Kilpeck Church

Sources 

Carving
Architecture in England
Romanesque architecture
Romanesque art